Sarykopa is a bittern salt lake in the Kostanay Region, Kazakhstan.

Sarykopa lies in the steppe of the central sector of the Turgay Basin in Zhangeldi District, in the southern area of Kostanay Region. There are a number of villages near the lake.

Geography
Sarykopa is an endorheic lake. Its shape is elongated, stretching roughly from SSW to NNE . In years of significant snowfall the lake becomes a single body of water and its waters may flow out into the Turgay river through a channel close to Tauysh village in the south, but such periods are very few and far between.

Fauna
Sarykopa is a refuge for birds such as the white-tailed lapwing, steppe gull, slender-billed curlew and the great white pelican, as well as the critically endangered siberian crane, but the effects of human action on the lake are unfavorable for wildlife.

See also
List of lakes of Kazakhstan

References

External links
Saryarka – Steppe and Lakes of Northern Kazakhstan
Steppe Gull barabensis adult, July 18 2010, Sarykopa

Lakes of Kazakhstan
Kostanay Region
Endorheic lakes of Asia